Mariia Holubtsova (born 20 December 2000) is a Ukrainian ice dancer. With her skating partner, Kyryl Bielobrov, she is the 2021 Pavel Roman Memorial bronze medalist and a two-time Ukrainian national silver medalist. The duo competed in the final segment at the 2016 and 2020 World Junior Championships.

Career

Early years 
Holubtsova began learning to skate in 2003. She skated with Ilia Bohomol before teaming up with Kyryl Bielobrov.

Holubtsova/Bielobrov debuted on the ISU Junior Grand Prix (JGP) series in September 2014, placing tenth in Japan.

2015–16 season 
Holubtsova/Bielobrov received two Junior Grand Prix assignments. They placed tenth at the 2015 JGP Slovakia in August and seventh at the 2015 JGP Croatia in October.

In February, they represented Ukraine in Norway at the 2016 Winter Youth Olympics. Ranked ninth in the short dance and sixth in the free dance, they finished seventh overall in the ice dancing competition. They also competed in the team event, placing fifth as members of Team Focus. In March, they competed at the 2016 World Junior Championships in Hungary. Ranked twentieth in the short dance, they qualified to the final segment and went on to finish eighteenth overall with a rank of seventeenth in the free dance.

2019–20 season 
Competing in the 2019–20 ISU Junior Grand Prix, Holubtsova/Bielobrov finished fifth in Latvia and seventh in Croatia. Ranked fourteenth in both segments, they placed fourteenth overall at the 2020 World Junior Championships in Tallinn, Estonia.

2021–22 season 
Holubtsova/Bielobrov made their senior international debut in October 2021, placing fourth at the Budapest Trophy in Hungary. In November, they took bronze at the Pavel Roman Memorial in the Czech Republic and then finished ninth at the 2021 CS Warsaw Cup, having ranked seventh in the rhythm dance and ninth in the free. In December, they finished second to Nazarova/Nikitin at the Ukrainian Championships and were selected to compete at the 2022 European Championships in Tallinn, Estonia.

In late February, Vladimir Putin ordered an invasion of Ukraine, as a result of which the International Skating Union banned all Russian and Belarusian skaters from competing. As a result, Holubtsova/Bielobrov had to change training locations from Kyiv to Oberstorf, Germany. In addition, they also began training at the Ice Dance Academy of Montreal in Montreal, Quebec.

2022–23 season 
Holubtsova/Bielobrov began their season with an eighth-place finish at the 2022 CS Nebelhorn Trophy. They then went on to make their senior ISU Grand Prix debut at 2022 Skate America, where they placed tenth. They were tenth as well as the 2022 MK John Wilson Trophy, their second Grand Prix.

Programs 
 With Bielobrov

Competitive highlights 
GP: Grand Prix; CS: Challenger Series; JGP: Junior Grand Prix

With Bielobrov

References

External links 
 

2000 births
Living people
Figure skaters at the 2016 Winter Youth Olympics
Sportspeople from Odesa
Ukrainian female ice dancers
21st-century Ukrainian women
Competitors at the 2023 Winter World University Games